The 2020–21 Prince Mohammad bin Salman League was the 4th season of the Prince Mohammad bin Salman League under its current name, and the 44th season of the Saudi First Division since its establishment in 1976. The season started on 31 October 2020 as a consequence of the postponement of the previous season's conclusion due to the COVID-19 pandemic.  Fixtures for the first half of the 2020–21 season were announced on 3 October 2020. Fixtures for the second half were announced on 18 January 2021.

The first team to be promoted was Al-Hazem, following their 4–2 away win against Al-Sahel on 20 April. They set the record for the earliest team to secure promotion with six games remaining as well as most points, most wins and most goals in a season. On 21 May, Al-Hazem secured their second title following a 1–0 away win against Hajer. The second team to be promoted was Al-Fayha, following 0–0 home draw with Al-Tai on 20 May. The final team to be promoted was Al-Tai who were promoted on the final matchday following a 2–0 away win over Arar.

Team changes
The following teams have changed division since the 2020–21 season.

To MS League
Promoted from Second Division
 Hajer
 Al-Diriyah
 Arar
 Al-Sahel

Relegated from Pro League
 Al-Fayha
 Al-Hazem
 Al-Adalah

From MS League
Promoted to Pro League
 Al-Batin
 Al-Qadsiah
 Al-Ain

Relegated to Second Division
 Al-Mujazzal
 Al-Taqadom
 Al-Ansar
 Hetten

Teams
A total of 20 teams are contesting the league, including 13 sides from the 2019–20 season, 4 promoted teams from the Second Division and the three relegated sides from the Pro League.

The first club to be relegated to the MS League was Al-Adalah, who were relegated after only a year in the top flight following a 1–1 home draw with Al-Raed. On 4 September 2020, Al-Hazem became the second club to be relegated, ending a 2-year stay in the Pro League following a 1–0 defeat away to Al-Shabab. On 9 September 2020, Al-Fayha became the third and final club to be relegated following a 1–0 defeat away to Al-Taawoun in the final matchday. Al-Fayha were relegated after three years in the Pro League.

The first club to be promoted was Hajer who were promoted following a 1–0 home win against Al-Akhdoud on 13 August 2020. The second club to be promoted was Al-Diriyah following a 1–1 home draw against Al-Qaisumah on 27 August 2020. The third club to be promoted was Al-Sahel who were promoted following a 3–0 away win against Al-Suqoor on 28 August 2020. The fourth and final club to be promoted was Arar who were promoted on the final matchday following a 1–0 away win against Al-Sharq.

Hajer defeated Al-Diriyah in the final to win their 2nd Second Division title. Arar defeated Al-Sahel in the third-place playoffs.

Al-Sahel and Arar will play in the Prince Mohammad bin Salman League for the first time in their history. Hajer return after a seasons absence and will play in their 29th overall season in the MS League. Al-Diriyah return to the MS League for the first time since getting relegated in 2015–16 season. They will play in their 4th season in the MS League. Al-Khaleej and Ohod will play in their 30th season in the MS League overtaking Al-Taawoun's record of 29 years in the second tier.

Stadia and locations

Note: Table lists in alphabetical order.

Foreign players
The number of foreign players is limited to 4 per team.

Players name in bold indicates the player is registered during the mid-season transfer window.

League table

Positions by round
The table lists the positions of teams after each week of matches. In order to preserve chronological evolvements, any postponed matches are not included in the round at which they were originally scheduled but added to the full round they were played immediately afterward.

Results

Statistics

Scoring

Top scorers

Hat-tricks 

Note
(H) – Home; (A) – Away

Clean sheets

Number of teams by region

See also
 2020–21 Saudi Professional League
 2020–21 Saudi Second Division

References

2
Saudi First Division League seasons
Saudi